Jean Marian Purdy (25 April 1945 – 16 March 1985) was a British nurse and embryologist and a pioneer of fertility treatment. Purdy was responsible with Robert Edwards and Patrick Steptoe for developing in vitro fertilisation. Louise Joy Brown, the first test-tube baby, was born on 25 July 1978, and Purdy was the first to see the embryonic cells dividing. Edwards was awarded the 2010 Nobel Prize in Physiology or Medicine for his work on the development of in vitro fertilisation; however, because the Nobel Prize is not awarded posthumously, neither Purdy nor Steptoe were eligible for consideration. Purdy was a co-founder of the Bourn Hall Clinic but her role there and in the development of IVF was ignored for 30 years.

Education 
Purdy attended Cambridgeshire High School for Girls between 1956 and 1963 where she became a prefect, joined sports teams and played violin in the orchestra. She  trained to be a nurse at Addenbrooke's Hospital in Cambridge.

Career 
After gaining registration as a nurse, Purdy moved to Southampton General Hospital, but was unhappy there and applied for a research post locally to work on tissue rejection, before transferring to Papworth Hospital in her home county where the first open-heart surgeries (and, later, heart transplants) were pioneered in Britain. In 1968, she applied for and obtained a post with Robert Edwards at the Physiological Laboratory in Cambridge.

Steptoe became the Director of the Centre for Human Reproduction, Oldham in 1969. Using laparoscopy, he collected the ova from volunteering infertile women who saw his place as their last hope to achieve a pregnancy. Purdy began her work with the Steptoe and Edwards as a lab technician. She played a significant and increasingly vital role, to the extent that, when she took time off to care for her sick mother, work had to pause.

During this time they had to endure criticism and hostility to their work. It was Purdy who first saw that a fertilised egg, which was to become Louise Brown, was dividing to make new cells. The birth of Louise Brown in 1978 changed perceptions and, to accommodate the increased demand and to train specialists, the team founded the Bourn Hall Clinic, Cambridgeshire in 1980.

Purdy was a co-author on 26 papers with Steptoe and Edwards, and 370 IVF children were conceived during her career.

Death and legacy 
Purdy died in 1985 at the age of 39 from malignant melanoma and is buried in Grantchester, Cambridgeshire.

University College London's award for the MRes Reproductive Science and Women's Health is named after her.

Recognition 
When it was decided that a plaque should be put up to record the achievement, Edwards suggested that the plaque should be phrased "Human in vitro fertilisation followed by the world's first successful pregnancy was performed at this hospital by Dr. Robert Edwards, Mr. Patrick Steptoe, Miss Jean Purdy and their supporting staff in November, 1977". Recognition for Purdy was ignored and the Oldham NHS Trust received a letter of complaint from Edwards in 1982. Bourn Hall erected a plaque in 2013 which again ignored Purdy's contribution.

In a plenary lecture in 1998, celebrating the 20th anniversary of clinical IVF, Robert Edwards gave tribute to Jean Purdy, saying: "There were three original pioneers in IVF and not just two". Professor Andrew Steptoe, son of Patrick Steptoe, unveiled a plaque in 2015 that acknowledged the three people who were involved in developing IVF. In 2018, to mark the 40th anniversary of IVF, Bourn Hall unveiled a memorial to Jean Purdy, the "world's first IVF nurse and embryologist. Co-founder of Bourn Hall Clinic".

References

External links 
 Brinsden, Peter R. "The Story of Patrick Steptoe, Robert Edwards, Jean Purdy, and Bourn Hall Clinic" in Kovacs, Gabor; Brinsden, Peter; DeCherney, Alan  (eds) (June 2018) In Vitro-Fertilization: The Pioneers' History, Cambridge University Press
Orbach, Connie (9 July 2018). Jean Purdy: The Forgotten IVF Pioneer. Science Museum, London
Southworth, Phoebe (10 June 2019). Nurse behind first IVF baby was snubbed for position on plaque honouring the achievement. The Daily Telegraph

1945 births
1985 deaths
20th-century English medical doctors
British embryologists
British women nurses
Deaths from cancer in England
Deaths from melanoma
English nurses
In vitro fertilisation
People from Cambridge